Kazakovtsy is a village in Grodno Region, Belarus located in the Dubno Selsoviet, Masty District. In 2009 the population was 16 people.

History 
During the interwar period, the village was located in Poland in Gmina Dubno, Grodno County, Białystok Voivodeship. In 1921 the village was inhabited by 112 people, all of which were Belarusians and belonged to Belarusian Orthodox Church.

Notes

References 

Populated places in Grodno Region